Events from the year 1607 in Ireland.

Incumbent
Monarch: James I

Events
 September 14 – Flight of the Earls: Hugh O'Neill, 2nd Earl of Tyrone and Rory O'Donnell, 1st Earl of Tyrconnell flee to Spain to avoid capture by the English crown.
Plantation of Ulster, following the Flight of the Earls.
The Kingdom of East Breifne is disestablished and settled by English and Scottish colonists.
Sir Randall MacDonnell settles 300 Presbyterian Scots families on his land in Antrim.
Enniskillen Castle is taken by the English.
Lifford comes into the possession of Sir Richard Hansard.
Construction of James's Fort, protecting Kinsale harbour, is completed to the design of Paul Ive.
Construction of Prince Rupert's Tower, protecting Cork Harbour, is completed about this date.

Births
March 20 – Lady Alice Boyle, later Alice Barry, Countess of Barrymore (d. 1667)
Geoffrey Baron, scholar, lawyer and rebel (d. 1651)
Approximate date – Sir George Hamilton, 1st Baronet, of Donalong (d. 1679)

Deaths
Richard Netterville, lawyer and politician (b. c. 1540)
Nicholas St Lawrence, 9th Baron Howth (b. c. 1550)

References

 
1600s in Ireland
Ireland
Years of the 17th century in Ireland